Steven R. H. Beach (born May 29, 1956) is Distinguished Research Professor in the Department of Psychology at the University of Georgia, where he also serves as co-director of the Center for Family Research. He is known for his research on marriage and depression.

References

External links
Faculty page

Living people
1956 births
Stony Brook University alumni
University of Georgia faculty
American clinical psychologists
American psychologists